Oatley Point Reserve is a reserve located in the Sydney suburb of Oatley.  It has panoramic views of Georges River and Oatley Bay, as well as some of the highest quality remnant coastal forest in the Municipality of Kogarah. It is home to a colony of sugar gliders, ringtailed possums and dusky antechinus.  It has a rocky tip/point- a popular spot for fishing.

See also
 Oatley Pleasure Grounds
Oatley Park
 Moore Reserve
 Parks in Sydney

References

Parks in Sydney